The Chris Larsen House is a historic residence located in Elk Horn, Iowa, United States. It was listed on the National Register of Historic Places in 1991.  The historic importance of the house is its association with Danish immigration into Shelby and Audubon counties from 1865 to 1924.  It is also the best example in the area of the frame,  gabled double-pile house type.  It follows a basic foursquare plan with a broad eavefront gabled roof with a broad central gabled dormer, and symmetrical fenestration on the facade. This type of house construction was popular in the local Danish immigrant community from the 1890s into the 1910s.  Chris Larsen, who had this house built in 1908, was a local merchant who immigrated to the United States in 1890.  He and his wife Amanda had three children, and they had several boarders living with them as well.

References

Houses completed in 1908
Houses in Shelby County, Iowa
National Register of Historic Places in Shelby County, Iowa
Houses on the National Register of Historic Places in Iowa
1908 establishments in Iowa